The Chrompet Flyover is an elevated rotary type interchange flyover that connects GST road (NH 45) with the Madras Institute of Technology gate in Chennai, India.

References

Road interchanges in India
Bridges and flyovers in Chennai
Bridges completed in 2014
2014 establishments in Tamil Nadu